Dungan is a term used in territories of the former Soviet Union to refer to a group of Muslim people of Hui origin. Turkic-speaking peoples in Xinjiang Province in Northwestern China also sometimes refer to Hui Muslims as Dungans. In both China and the former Soviet republics where they reside, however, members of this ethnic group call themselves Hui because Dungans are descendants of historical Hui groups that migrated to Central Asia.

In the censuses of the countries of the former Soviet Union, the Dungans (enumerated separately from Chinese) are found in Kazakhstan (36,900 according to the 1999 census), Kyrgyzstan (58,409 according to the 2009 census) and Russia (801 according to the 2002 census).

History

Migration from China 

In the Ferghana Valley, the first Dungans to appear in Central Asia originated from Kuldja and Kashgar, as slaves captured by raiders; they mostly served in private wealthy households. After the Russians conquered Central Asia in the late 19th century and abolished slavery, most female Dungan slaves remained where they had originally been held captive. Russian ethnographer Validimir Petrovich Nalivkin and his wife said that "women slaves almost all remained in place, because they either were married to workers and servants of their former owners or they were too young to begin an independent life". Dungan women slaves were of low status and not regarded highly in Bukhara.

Turkic Muslim slave-raiders from Khoqand did not distinguish between Hui Muslim and Han Chinese, enslaving Hui Muslims in violation of Islamic law. During the Afaqi Khoja revolts Turkic Muslim Khoja Jahangir Khoja led an invasion of Kashgar from the Kokand Khanate and Jahangir's forces captured several hundred Dungan Chinese Muslims (Tungan or Hui) who were taken to Kokand. Tajiks bought two Chinese slaves from Shaanxi; they were enslaved for a year before being returned by the Tajik Beg Ku-bu-te to China. All Dungans captured, both merchants and the 300 soldiers Janhangir captured in Kashgar, had their queues cut off when brought to Kokand and Central Asia as prisoners. It was reported that many of the captives became slaves. Accounts of these slaves in Central Asia increased. The queues were removed from Dungan Chinese Muslim prisoners and then sold or given away. Some of them escaped to Russian territory where they were repatriated back to China and the accounts of their captures were recorded in Chinese records. The Russians record an incident where they rescued these Chinese Muslim merchants who escaped, after they were sold by Jahangir's Army in Central Asia and sent them back to China.

The Dungan in the former Soviet republics are Hui who fled China in the aftermath of the Hui Minorities' War (also known as the "Dungan Rebellion") in the 19th century. According to Rimsky-Korsakoff (1992), three separate groups of the Hui people fled to the Russian Empire across the Tian Shan Mountains during the exceptionally severe winter of 1877/78 after the end of the Hui Minorities' War:
 The first group, of some 1000 people, originally from Turpan in Xinjiang, led by Ma Daren (馬大人, 'the Great Man Ma'), also known as Ma Da-lao-ye (馬大老爺, 'the Great Master Ma'), reached Osh in Southern Kyrgyzstan.
 The second group, originally from Didaozhou (狄道州) in Gansu, led by ahong Ma Yusuf (馬郁素夫), also known as Ah Ye Laoren (阿爺老人, 'the Old Man O'Granpa'), were settled in the spring of 1878 in the village of Yrdyk ( or Ырдык) some 15 km from Karakol in Eastern Kyrgyzstan. They numbered 1130 on arrival.
 The third group, originally from Shaanxi, led by Bai Yanhu (白彦虎; also spelt Bo Yanhu; often called by his followers "虎大人", 'The Great Man Hu (Tiger)', 1829(?)-1882), one of the leaders of the rebellion, were settled in the village of Karakunuz (now Masanchi), in modern Zhambyl Province of Kazakhstan. It is 8 km north from the city Tokmak in northwestern Kyrgyzstan. This group numbered 3314 on arrival. Bai Yanhu's name in other romanizations was Bo-yan-hu or Pai Yen-hu; other names included Boyan-akhun (Akhund or Imam Boyan) and Muhammad Ayyub.

The next wave of immigration followed in the early 1880s. In accordance with the terms of the Treaty of Saint Petersburg (1881), which required the withdrawal of the Russian troops from the Upper Ili Basin (the Kulja area), the Dungan (Hui) and Taranchi (Uyghur) people of the region were allowed to opt for moving to the Russian side of the border. Many chose that option; according to Russian statistics, 4,682 Hui moved to the Russian Empire under the treaty. They migrated in many small groups between 1881 and 1883, settling in the village of Sokuluk some 30 km west of Bishkek, as well as in a number of locations between the Chinese border and Sokuluk, in Southeastern Kazakhstan and in Northern Kyrgyzstan.

Name

In the Russian Empire, Soviet Union, and the post-Soviet states, the Dungans continue to refer to themselves as the Hui people (Huízú; in Cyrillic Soviet Dungan spelling, xуэйзў).

The name Dungan is of obscure origin. One popular theory derives this word from Turkic döñän ("one who turns"), which can be compared to Chinese 回 (huí), which has a similar meaning. Another theory derives it from the Chinese 东甘 (Dong Gan), 'Eastern Gansu', the region to which many of the Dungan can trace their ancestry; however the character gan (干) used in the name of the ethnic group is different from that used in the name of the province (甘).

The term "Dungan" ("Tonggan", "Donggan") has been used by Central Asian Turkic-and Tajik-speaking people to refer to Chinese-speaking Muslims for several centuries. Joseph Fletcher cites Turkic and Persian manuscripts related to the preaching of the 17th century Kashgarian Sufi master Muhammad Yūsuf (or, possibly, his son Afaq Khoja) inside the Ming Empire (in today's Gansu and/or Qinghai), where the Kashgarian preacher is told to have converted 'ulamā-yi Tunganiyyān (i.e., "Dungan ulema") into Sufism.<ref name=lipman>. Lipman's source is: Joseph Fletcher, "The Naqshbandiya in Northwest China", in {{cite book|title=Studies on Chinese and Islamic Inner Asia|editor=Beatrcie Manz| place=London|publisher=Variorum|year=1995}}</ref>

Presumably, it was from the Turkic languages that the term was borrowed into Russian (дунгане, dungane (pl.); дунганин, dunganin (sing.)) and Chinese, as well as to Western European languages.

In English and German, the ethnonym "Dungan", in various spelling forms, was attested as early as the 1830s, sometimes typically referring to the Hui people of Xinjiang. For example, James Prinsep in 1835 mentions Muslim "Túngánis" in "Chinese Tartary".Prinsep's article is also available in "The Chinese Repository", 1843, p. 234 On Google Books. A modern (2003) reprint is available, . In 1839, Karl Ernst von Baer in his German-language account of Russian Empire and adjacent Asian lands has a one-page account of Chinese-speaking Muslim "Dungani" or "Tungani", who had visited Orenburg in 1827 with a caravan from China; he also mentions "Tugean" as a spelling variant used by other authors. R.M. Martin in 1847 mentions "Tungani" merchants in Yarkand.

The word (mostly in the form "Dungani" or "Tungani", sometimes "Dungens" or "Dungans") acquired some currency in English and other western languages when a number of books in the 1860-1870s discussed the Dungan Rebellion in Northwestern China. At the time, one could see European and American authors apply the term Tungani to the Hui people both in Xinjiang,
and in Shaanxi and Gansu (which at the time included today's Ningxia and Qinghai as well). Authors aware of the general picture of the spread of Islam in China, viewed these "Tungani" as just one of the groups of China's Muslims.

Marshall Broomhall, who has a chapter on "the Tungan Rebellion" in his 1910 book, introduces "the name Tungan or Dungan, by which the Muslims of these parts [i.e., NE China] are designated, in contradistinction as the Chinese Buddhists who are spoken of as Kithay"; the reference to "Khitay" shows that he was viewing the two terms as used by Turkic speakers. Broomhall's book also contains a translation of the report on Chinese Muslims by the Ottoman writer named Abd-ul-Aziz. Abd-ul-Aziz divides the "Tungan people" into two branches: "the Tunagans of China proper" (including, apparently all Hui people in "China proper", as he also talks e.g. about the Tungans having 17 mosques in Beijing), and "The Tungans of Chinese and Russian Turkestan", who still look and speak Chinese, but have often also learned the "Turkish" language.

Later authors continued to use the term Dungan (in various transcriptions) for, specifically, the Hui people of Xinjiang.
For example, Owen Lattimore, writing c. 1940, maintains the terminological distinction between these two related groups: "T'ungkan" (i.e. Wade-Giles for "Dungan"), described by him as the descendants of the Gansu Hui people resettled in Xinjiang in 17-18th centuries, vs. e.g. "Gansu Moslems" or generic "Chinese Moslems". The term (usually as "Tungans") continues to be used by many modern historians writing about the 19th century Dungan Rebellion (e.g., by Denis C. Twitchett in The Cambridge History of China, by James A. Millward in his economic history of the region, or by Kim Ho-dong in his monograph).

Dungan villages in Kazakhstan and Kyrgyzstan
The Dungans themselves referred to Karakunuz (sometimes Караконыз or Караконуз) as Ingpan (Yingpan), which means 'a camp, an encampment'. In 1965, Karakunuz was renamed Masanchi (sometimes spelt as "Masanchin"), after Magaza Masanchi or Masanchin (Dungan: Магәзы Масанчын), a Dungan participant in the Communist Revolution and a Soviet Kazakhstan statesman.

The following table summarizes location of Dungan villages in Kazakhstan and Kyrgyzstan, alternative names used for them, and their Dungan population as reported by Ma Tong (2003). The Cyrillic Dungan spelling of place names is as in the textbook by Sushanlo, Imazov (1988); the spelling of the name in Chinese character is as in Ma Tong (2003).

The position of the Kazakhstan villages within the administrative division of Jambyl Region, and the total population of each village can be found at the provincial statistics office web site.

Besides the traditionally Dungan villages, many Dungan people live in the nearby cities, such as Bishkek, Tokmok, Karakol.

Soviet rule

Reportedly, Dungans were "strongly anti-Japanese". During the 1930s, a White Russian driver for Nazi German agent Georg Vasel in Xinjiang was afraid to meet Hui general Ma Zhongying, saying: "You know how the Tungans hate the Russians." Vasel passed the Russian driver off as a German.

Present day

As Ding (2005) notes, "[t]he Dungan people derive from China's Hui people, and now live mainly in Kyrgyzstan and Kazakhstan. Their population is about 110,000. This people have now developed a separate ethnicity outside China, yet they have close relations with the Hui people in culture, ethnic characteristics and ethnic identity." Today the Dungans play a role as cultural "shuttles" and economic mediators between Central Asia and the Chinese world. Husei Daurov, the president of the Dungan center, has succeeded in transforming cultural exchanges into commercial partnerships.

In February 2020, a conflict broke out between ethnic Kazakhs and Dungans in the Korday area in Kazakhstan on the border to Kyrgyzstan. According to official Kazakh sources, 10 people were killed and many more were wounded. In the altercation, cars and homes were burned and rifles were fired. 600 people fled across the border to Kyrgyzstan.

Language

The Dungan language, which the Dungan people call the "Hui language" (Хуэйзў йүян/回族語言 or Huejzw jyian), is similar to the Zhongyuan dialect of Mandarin Chinese, which is widely spoken in the south of Gansu and the west of Guanzhong in Shaanxi in China.

Like other varieties of Chinese, Dungan is tonal. There are two main dialects, one with four tones and the other, considered standard, with three tones in the final position in words and four tones in the non-final position.

Some Dungan vocabulary may sound old-fashioned to Chinese people. For example, they refer to a President as an "Emperor" (Хуаңды/皇帝, huan'g-di) and call government offices yamen (ямын/衙門, ya-min), a term for mandarins' offices in ancient China. Their language also contains many loanwords from Arabic, Persian and Turkic. Since the 1940s, the language has been written in Cyrillic script, though the language has historically also used Chinese characters and Xiao'erjing (Arabic script used for Chinese), though these are now considered obsolete.

Dungan people are generally multilingual. In addition to Dungan Chinese, more than two-thirds of the Dungan speak Russian and a small proportion can speak Kyrgyz or other languages belonging to the titular nationalities of the countries where they live.

Culture

Nineteenth century explorer Henry Lansdell noted that the Dungan people abstained from spirits and opium, neither smoked nor took snuff and
"are of middle height, and inclined to be stout. They have high and prominent foreheads, thick and arched eyebrows, eyes rather sunken, fairly prominent cheek-bones, face oval, mouth of average size, lips thick, teeth normal, chin round, ears small and compressed, hair black and smooth, beard scanty and rough, skin smooth, neck strong, and extremities of average proportions. The characteristics of the Dungans are kindness, industry, and hospitality.
They engage in husbandry, horticulture, and trade. In domestic life parental authority is very strong. After the birth of a child the mother does not get up for fifteen days, and, without any particular feast, the child receives its name in the presence of a mullah the day succeeding that of its birth. Circumcision takes place on the eighth, ninth, or tenth day. When a girl is married she receives a dower. In sickness they have recourse to medicine and doctors, but never to exorcisms. 
After death, the mullah and the aged assemble to recite prayers; the corpse is wrapped in white linen and then buried, but never burned. On returning from the interment the mullah and the elders partake of bread and meat. To saints they erect monuments like little mosques, for others simple hillocks. The widow may re-marry after 90 days, and on the third anniversary of the death a feast takes place."

The Dungan are primarily farmers, growing rice and vegetables such as sugar beet. Many also raise dairy cattle. In addition, some are involved in opium production. The Dungan tend to be endogamous.

The Dungan are well known for their hospitality and hold many ceremonies and banquets to preserve their culture. They have elaborate and colorful observances of birthdays, weddings, and funerals. In addition, schools have museums to preserve other parts of their culture, such as embroidery, traditional clothing, silver jewelry, paper cuts of animals and flowers and tools.

The Dungan still practice elements of Chinese culture, in cuisine and attire, up to 1948 they also practiced foot binding. The conservative Shaanxi Dungan cling more tightly to Chinese customs than the Gansu Dungan.

The Dungans have retained Chinese traditions which have disappeared in modern China. Traditional marriage practices are still widespread with matchmakers, the marriages conducted by the Dungan are similar to Chinese marriages in the 19th century, hairstyles worn by women and attire date back to the Qing dynasty.

Shaanxi female attire is still Chinese, though the rest of the Dungans dress in western attire. Chopsticks are used by Dungans. The cuisine of the Dungan resembles northwestern Chinese cuisine.

Around the late 19th century the bride price was between 240 and 400 rubles for Dungan women. Dungans have been known to take other women such as Kirghiz and Tatars as brides willingly, or kidnap Kirghiz girls. Shaanxi Dungans are even conservative when marrying with other Dungans; they want only other Shaanxi Dungans marrying their daughters, while their sons are allowed to marry Gansu Dungan, Kirghiz, and Kazakh women. As recently as 1962, inter-ethnic marriage was reported to be anathema among Dungans.

Identity

During the Qing dynasty, the term Zhongyuanren was synonymous with being mainstream Chinese, especially referring to Han Chinese and Hui Muslims in Xinjiang or Central Asia.

For religious reasons, while Hui people do not consider themselves Han and are not Han Chinese, they consider themselves part of the wider Chinese race and refer to themselves as Zhongyuanren. The Dungan people, descendants of Hui who fled to Central Asia, called themselves Zhongyuanren in addition to the standard labels Lao Huihui and Huizi. Zhongyuanren was used generally by Turkic Muslims to refer to Han and Hui Chinese people. When Central Asian invaders from Kokand invaded Kashgar, in a letter the Kokandi commander criticizes the Kashgari Turkic Muslim Ishaq for allegedly not behaving like a Turkic-origin Muslim and wanting to be a Zhongyuanren.

See also 
 Dungan revolt (1862–1877), rebellion of various Muslim ethnic groups in Shaanxi and Gansu, China
 Dungan revolt (1895–1896), rebellion of various Muslim ethnic groups in Qinghai and Gansu, China
 Tunganistan

Notes

References
Sources

Works cited
 

Further reading
 Allès, Elisabeth. 2005. "The Chinese-speaking Muslims (Dungans) of Central Asia: A Case of Multiple Identities in a Changing Context," Asian Ethnicity 6, No. 2 (June): 121-134.
 Ding Hong. 2005. "A Comparative Study on the Cultures of the Dungan and the Hui People," Asian Ethnicity'' 6, No. 2 (June): 135-140.
 Svetlana Rimsky-Korsakoff Dyer. 1979. "Soviet Dungan kolkhozes in the Kirghiz SSR and the Kazakh SSR (Oriental monograph series)". Faculty of Asian Studies, Australian National University. .
 Svetlana Rimsky-Korsakoff Dyer. Karakunuz: An Early Settlement of the Chinese Muslims in Russia, with an English translation of V.Tsibuzgin and A.Shmakov's work. "Asian Folklore Studies", Vol. 51 (1992), pp. 243–279.
 马通 (Ma Tong), "吉尔吉斯草原上的东干族穆斯林文化" (Dungans' Muslim culture on the grasslands of Kyrgyzstan), Series "丝绸之路上的穆斯林文化" (Muslim Cultures of the Silk Road), 2003-April–27. . (This article has some details additional to Rimsky-Korsakoff (1992)).
 Сушанло Мухамед, Имазов Мухаме.  "Совет хуэйзў вынщүә". Фрунзе, "Мектеп" чубаншә, 1988. (Mukhamed Sushanlo, Mukhame  Imazov. "Dungan Soviet Literature: textbook for 9th and 10th grade". Frunze, 1988). .
 http://nirc.nanzan-u.ac.jp/publications/afs/pdf/a916.pdf

External links

 Map of Dungan settlement in Kyrgyzstan and Kazakhstan
 'A Very Dungan Wedding' Article on Kyrgyz Dungans
 Dungans Forum (rus)
 Chinabroadcast.cn
 Soviet Census data analyzed by mother tongue and second language, in English
 Association of Dungans of the Kyrgyz Republic, in English and Russian
Samples of the Dungans' Cuisine

Dungan